Sania Mirza and Anastasia Rodionova were the defending champions but decided not to participate.
Kimiko Date-Krumm and Casey Dellacqua won the final against Akgul Amanmuradova and Alexandra Panova with the score 6–3, 6–2.

Seeds

Draw

Draw

References
 Main Draw

Doubles
PTT Pattaya Open - Doubles
 in women's tennis